Wilbur School, also known as Wilbur Community Center, is a historic one-room school building located in Gregg Township, Morgan County, Indiana.  It was built about 1876, and is a one-story, gable front, brick building with Italianate style design elements.  It features double coursed segmental arched window openings.  A concrete block addition was constructed when the building was converted for use as a community centre.

It was listed on the National Register of Historic Places in 1993.

References

One-room schoolhouses in Indiana
School buildings on the National Register of Historic Places in Indiana
Italianate architecture in Indiana
School buildings completed in 1876
Buildings and structures in Morgan County, Indiana
National Register of Historic Places in Morgan County, Indiana